Paulus Johannes "Paul" Biegel (25 March 1925 – 21 October 2006) was a successful and prolific Dutch writer of children's literature.

Biography
Paul Biegel was born in Bussum in 1925. His father, Hermann Biegel, was of German descent, and owned a building materials shop. With his wife Madeleine Povel-Guillot he had nine children, six girls and three boys, of which Paul was the youngest. He wasn't a prolific reader as a child, preferring to play outside. His favourite books where the fairy tales of the brothers Grimm and the works of Jules Verne. He studied in Bussum (primary school) and Amsterdam, graduating in 1945.

His first story, De ontevreden kabouter ("The unhappy gnome"), written when he was 14 years old, was printed in the newspaper De Tijd. He wanted to become a pianist, but decided that he didn't have enough talent. He commenced Law Studies, but stopped these in 1953. He wrote several newspaper comics, the most important of which was Minter and Hinter, which appeared in Het Vrije Volk for ten stories and 579 episodes. In 1959, he started working in the comic studio of Marten Toonder as a comics writer for the Kappie series.

He only published his first book, De gouden gitaar, in 1962. He became one of the most important Dutch writers for children in 1965, when he received the Gouden Griffel for Het sleutelkruid. In 1973 he won the Staatsprijs voor kinder- en jeugdliteratuur literary award. He has written over 50 books, mostly published by Holland, and many of his books have been translated in English, French, German, Danish, Swedish, Welsh, South African, Japanese, Turkish, Greek, and Spanish. His own favourites were De tuinen van Dorr and De soldatenmaker. Other authors he appreciated included J. R. R. Tolkien, J. K. Rowling, and Hans Christian Andersen.

Paul Biegel lived in Amsterdam. He married Marijke Sträter in 1960, with whom he had a daughter, Leonie, in 1963, and in 1964 a son, Arthur, who committed suicide when he was 28. His marriage ultimately failed, and only at a later age did he publicly admit to being homosexual. He died in 2006 and was buried at Zorgvlied cemetery. In 2007, publishers Holland (publisher) and Lemniscaat started reissuing twenty of his best works in the Biegelbibliotheek.

Bibliography 
1962: De gouden gitaar
1962: Het grote boek
1964: De kukelhaan
1964: Het sleutelkruid: translated as The King of the Copper Mountains (1967, J. M. Dent)
1964: Het lapjesbeest
1966: Kinderverhalen
1967: Ik wou dat ik anders was, translated as The Seven-times Search (1971, J. M. Dent)
1969: De Tuinen van Dorr, translated as The Gardens of Dorr (1975, J. M. Dent), illustrated by Tonke Dragt
1970: De zeven fabels uit Ubim
1971: Sebastiaan Slorp
1971: De twaalf rovers, translated as The Twelve Robbers (1974, J. M. Dent)
1971: De kleine kapitein, translated as The Little Captain (1971, J. M. Dent)
1973: Het olifantenfeest, translated as The Elephant Party (1977, Kestrell and Puffin Books)
1973: De kleine kapitein in het land van Waan en Wijs, translated as The little Captain and the Seven Towers (1973, J. M. Dent)
1974: De vloek van Woestewolf, translated as The Curse of the Werewolf (1981, Blackie and Son Limited)
1974: Het stenen beeld, translated as Far Beyond and Back Again (1977, J. M. Dent)
1974: Twaalf sloeg de klok, translated as The Clock Struck Twelve (1979, Glover & Blair)
1975: De kleine kapitein en de schat van Schrik en Vreze, translated as The little Captain and the Pirate Treasure (1980, J. M. Dent)
1975: De zeven veren van de papegaai
1976: Het spiegelkasteel, translated as The Looking-glass Castle (1979, Blackie and Son)
1976: De dwergjes van Tuil, translated as The Dwarfs of Nosegay (1978, Blackie and Son)
1977: De rover Hoepsika, translated as Robber Hopsika (1978, J. M. Dent)
1977: De brieven van de generaal, translated as Letters from the general (1979, J. M. Dent)
1977: Wie je droomt ben je zelf
1977: De wenende aap van Kleef
1978: Virgilius van Tuil, translated as The fattest Dwarf of Nosegay (1980, Blackie and Son)
1979: Virgilius van Tuil op zoek naar een taart, translated as Virgil Nosegay and the Cake Hunt (1981, Blackie and Son)
1979: De toverhoed, translated as The Tin Can Beast and other stories (1980, Glover & Blair)
1980: Virgilius van Tuil en de rijke oom uit Zweden, translated as Virgil Nosegay and the Hupmobile (1983, Blackie and Son)
1981: Jiri, translated as Crocodile Man (1982, J. M. Dent)
1981: Haas, eerste boek: Voorjaar
1982: Haas, tweede boek: Zomer
1982: Haas, derde boek: Najaar
1982: Virgilius van Tuil overwintert bij de mensen, translated as Virgil Nosegay and the Wellington Boots (1984, Blackie and Son)
1984: Tante Mathilde en de sterren van de Grote Beer
1984: De zwarte weduwe
1984: Japie en de dingen
1984: Een tijdje later
1985: Japie en het grote geld
1985: Van de oude dame en de muis
1986: Japie rekent af
1986: Het wolkenschip
1987: De rode prinses (illustrated by Fiel van der Veen)
1989: Beer in het verkeer
1989: Het eiland daarginds
1990: Anderland, een Brandaan-mythe
1991: Juttertje Tim
1992: Nachtverhaal
1994: De soldatenmaker
1995: De karabijn
1996: Het ijzeren tapijt
1999: Laatste verhalen van de eeuw
2002: Een been stokkebeen
2003: Man en muis
2004: De roep van de kinkhoorn
2004: Swing!
2005: Wegloop
2007: De Lorrelee

Reworkings of classical books and stories
1966: Sprookjes van Grimm
1967: De rattevanger van Hameln
1969: Sprookjesmolen
1970: Sagen van Grimm
1971: Een toren naar de maan
1972: Reinaart de Vos
1975: De fabels van Aesopus
1995: Het beleg van Troje
1997: De zwerftochten van Aeneas

Translations
Among the 35 books Paul Biegel translated into Dutch are The Borrowers series by Mary Norton, three books by Michael Foreman, two by John Burningham, three by Tony Ross, and four by Kaye Umansky.

Awards 
 Dutch State Award for Children's Literature (1973)
 Woutertje Pieterse Prijs (1991: Anderland and 2000: Laatste verhalen van de eeuw)
 Nienke van Hichtum-prijs (1973: De twaalf rovers)
 Gouden Griffel (1965: Het sleutelkruid; 1972: De kleine kapitein and 1993: Nachtverhaal)
 Zilveren Griffel (1972: De twaalf rovers; 1974: Het olifantenfeest; 1982: Haas; 1988: ''De rode prinses)
In 1996, Paul Biegel was nominated for the Hans Christian Andersen Award.
In 1999, he was made a Knight in the Order of the Netherlands Lion.

Notes

External links
 
  (Biegel Rights Agency)
Biography at publisher Holland (archived 2002-02-27)
 
 

1925 births
2006 deaths
Dutch children's writers
Dutch comics writers
Knights of the Order of the Netherlands Lion
People from Bussum
Woutertje Pieterse Prize winners
Nienke van Hichtum Prize winners
Gouden Griffel winners